Peneothello is a genus of passerine birds in the Australasian robin family Petroicidae.

The genus Peneothello was introduced by the Australian born ornithologist Gregory Mathews in 1920 with white-winged robin (Peneothello sigillata) as the type species. The name combines the Latin pene "almost" and othello. Othello is the "Moorish" (i.e. black) Shakespeare character.

Species
The genus contains the following five species:

References

External links

 
Petroicidae
Bird genera
 
Taxonomy articles created by Polbot